The common thick-thumbed bat (Glischropus tylopus) is a species of vesper bat found in Brunei, Indonesia, Malaysia, Myanmar, Philippines, and Thailand. It has two subspecies:

G. t. tylopus
G. t. batjanus

References

Glischropus
Taxa named by George Edward Dobson
Mammals described in 1875
Bats of Southeast Asia
Bats of Indonesia
Bats of Malaysia
Mammals of Borneo
Mammals of Myanmar
Mammals of the Philippines
Mammals of Thailand
Taxonomy articles created by Polbot